Platyhedylidae is a family of sacoglossan sea slugs, marine gastropod mollusks in the superfamily Platyhedylidae.

This family has no subfamilies.

Genera and species
There are two genera in the family Platyhedylidae: 

 Gascoignella - Jensen, 1985
Species Gascoignella aprica - Jensen, 1985
Species Gascoignella jabae - Swennen, 2001
Species Gascoignella nukuli - Swennen, 2001
 Platyhedyle - Salwini-Plawen, 1973 - type genus
 Species Platyhedyle denudata - Salvini-Plawen, 1973

References